Ivan Ivanov (born 6 December 1921) was a Bulgarian sports shooter. He competed in the trap event at the 1952 Summer Olympics.

References

External links
 

1921 births
Possibly living people
Bulgarian male sport shooters
Olympic shooters of Bulgaria
Shooters at the 1952 Summer Olympics
Place of birth missing